In mathematics, a CH-quasigroup, introduced by , is a symmetric quasigroup in which any three elements generate an abelian quasigroup.  "CH" stands for cubic hypersurface.

References

Non-associative algebra